Jilib District is a district in the southern Middle Juba (Jubbada Dhexe) region of Somalia. Its capital lies at Jilib.

References

External links
 Districts of Somalia
 Administrative map of Jilib District

Districts of Somalia

Middle Juba